Canadian federal elections have provided the following results in Central Ontario.

Regional profile 
The region is the central section of Southern Ontario, mainly comprising the rural area around Lake Simcoe.  This has traditionally been the most conservative region of Ontario, in sharp contrast to the Greater Toronto Area to the south.  It has historically been the backbone of support for the provincial Tories.

The citizens of the region are mostly white, Protestant, and agrarian, with a large number of social conservatives.  Some parts of this region are as conservative as rural Alberta.  This region was the heartland of the Reform Party and Canadian Alliance in Ontario, with Simcoe Centre electing a Reform MP in 1993—Reform's only victory east of Manitoba, ever. However, due to massive Reform-PC vote-splitting, the  Liberals swept the region during the Chrétien era. The Unite the Right movement (accompanied by Chrétien's departure from office) led to the newly united Conservative Party seizing all but four of the region's seats in 2004.  In 2006, Liberal support in this region melted; the only Liberal elected in this region was Belinda Stronach, a former Conservative who crossed the floor in 2005.  Stronach's seat reverted to the Conservatives in 2008. In 2011, the Conservatives again swept the region, with the NDP's late-campaign surge propelling them to second in all but one riding..

The region was one of the few that resisted the massive Liberal surge in Ontario in 2015, though the Liberals managed to take Stronach's old riding of Newmarket—Aurora on the outer fringe of the Greater Toronto Area, a region that swung heavily to the Liberals in this election. They also managed to take all of Peterborough.

The riding of Peterborough—Kawartha  (formerly simply Peterborough) had long been recognized by political scientists as one of the best bellwether ridings in the country.

2019 - 43rd General Election

2015 - 42nd General Election

2011 - 41st General Election

2008 - 40th General Election

2006 - 39th General Election

2004 - 38th General Election

2000 - 37th General Election

Notes

References

Central